The Combination Store building is an historic structure in the Gaslamp Quarter, San Diego, California, USA. It was built in 1880.

See also
 List of Gaslamp Quarter historic buildings

External links

 

1880 establishments in California
Buildings and structures in San Diego
Commercial buildings completed in 1880
Gaslamp Quarter, San Diego